Monsone has been borne by at least three ships of the Italian Navy and may refer to:

 , previously the French mercantile Maumusson purchased by Italy in 1915 and renamed. She was sunk in 1916.
 , previously the Brazilian mercantile Maranbac purchased by Italy in 1916 and renamed. She was discarded in 1920.
 , a  launched in 1942 and sunk in 1943.

Italian Navy ship names